The Protocol Against the Smuggling of Migrants by Land, Sea and Air, supplementing the Convention against Transnational Organised Crime, was adopted by the United Nations General Assembly in 2000. It is also referred to as the Smuggling Protocol. It is one of the three Palermo protocols, the others being the Protocol to Prevent, Suppress and Punish Trafficking in Persons, especially Women and Children and the Protocol against the Illicit Manufacturing and Trafficking in Firearms, Their Parts and Components and Ammunition.

The Smuggling Protocol entered into force on 28 January 2004. As of October 2022, the protocol has been signed by 112 parties and ratified by 151.

The Protocol is aimed at the protection of rights of migrants and the reduction of the power and influence of organized criminal groups that abuse migrants. It emphasizes the need to provide migrants with humane treatment, and the need for comprehensive international approaches to combating people smuggling, including socio-economic measures that address the root causes of migration.

The Protocol requires States Parties that have ratified to ensure that migrant smuggling (also called people smuggling) is criminalised in accordance with its terms, and those set out in the Convention on Transnational Organised Crime.

Given the current political priority around people smuggling, it is perhaps surprising that a concerted international focus on defining and responding to migrant smuggling only occurred in the 1990s. This focus followed sharp rises in irregular migration to the United States, and to Europe in the 1980s and 90s.  A focus on those who facilitate irregular migration - rather than migrants themselves - was seen as a critical element of any response. The resulting legal framework was the Protocol against the Smuggling of Migrants by Land, Sea and Air (Migrant Smuggling Protocol), that supplements the parent instrument, the United Nations Convention against Transnational Organized Crime.

The Migrant Smuggling Protocol does not provide a complete or self-contained legal regime but instead exists as part of a "dense web of rights, obligations and responsibilities drawn not just from the Protocol and Convention but also from the law of the sea, human rights law, and refugee law."

Unlike human trafficking, people smuggling is characterized by the consent between customer and smuggler - a contractual agreement that typically terminates upon arrival in the destination location.  However, smuggling situations can nonetheless in reality descend into situations that can best be described as extreme human rights abuses, with smuggled migrants subject to threats, abuse, exploitation and torture, and even death at the hands of smugglers (see for example, case studies in Gallagher and David, International Law of Migrant Smuggling, 2014, 9-10).

See also
Human trafficking
Illegal immigration
People smuggling

Notes

broken link

External links
Text of protocol
UNODC Smuggling of Migrants
UNODC, Model Law on Smuggling of Migrants
Ratifications SOM Protocol - UN Treaty Collection
programmes regarding the protocol
A.Gallagher and F.David, International Law of Migrant Smuggling, 2014

Labour treaties
Protocol against the Smuggling of Migrants by Land, Sea and Air
United Nations treaties
Protocol against the Smuggling of Migrants by Land, Sea and Air
Protocol against the Smuggling of Migrants by Land, Sea and Air
Child labour treaties
Protocol against the Smuggling of Migrants by Land, Sea and Air
Treaties of Albania
Treaties of Algeria
Treaties of Angola
Treaties of Antigua and Barbuda
Treaties of Argentina
Treaties of Armenia
Treaties of Australia
Treaties of Austria
Treaties of Azerbaijan
Treaties of the Bahamas
Treaties of Bahrain
Treaties of Barbados
Treaties of Belarus
Treaties of Belgium
Treaties of Belize
Treaties of Benin
Treaties of Bosnia and Herzegovina
Treaties of Botswana
Treaties of Brazil
Treaties of Bulgaria
Treaties of Burkina Faso
Treaties of Burundi
Treaties of Cambodia
Treaties of Cameroon
Treaties of Canada
Treaties of Cape Verde
Treaties of the Central African Republic
Treaties of Chile
Treaties of Costa Rica
Treaties of Croatia
Treaties of Cuba
Treaties of Cyprus
Treaties of the Czech Republic
Treaties of the Democratic Republic of the Congo
Treaties of Denmark
Treaties of Djibouti
Treaties of Dominica
Treaties of the Dominican Republic
Treaties of Ecuador
Treaties of Egypt
Treaties of El Salvador
Treaties of Estonia
Treaties of Ethiopia
Treaties entered into by the European Union
Treaties of Finland
Treaties of France
Treaties of Gabon 
Treaties of the Gambia
Treaties of Georgia (country)
Treaties of Germany
Treaties of Ghana
Treaties of Greece
Treaties of Grenada
Treaties of Guatemala
Treaties of Guinea
Treaties of Guyana
Treaties of Haiti
Treaties of Honduras
Treaties of Hungary
Treaties of India
Treaties of Indonesia
Treaties of Iraq
Treaties of Italy
Treaties of Jamaica
Treaties of Kazakhstan
Treaties of Kenya
Treaties of Kiribati
Treaties of Kuwait
Treaties of Kyrgyzstan
Treaties of Laos
Treaties of Latvia
Treaties of Lebanon
Treaties of Lesotho
Treaties of Liberia
Treaties of the Libyan Arab Jamahiriya
Treaties of Liechtenstein
Treaties of Lithuania
Treaties of Luxembourg
Treaties of Madagascar
Treaties of Malawi
Treaties of Mali
Treaties of Malta
Treaties of Mauritania
Treaties of Mauritius
Treaties of Mexico
Treaties of Monaco
Treaties of Mongolia
Treaties of Montenegro
Treaties of Mozambique
Treaties of Myanmar
Treaties of Namibia
Treaties of Nauru
Treaties of the Netherlands
Treaties of New Zealand
Treaties of Nicaragua
Treaties of Niger
Treaties of Nigeria
Treaties of Norway
Treaties of Oman
Treaties of Palau
Treaties of Panama
Treaties of Paraguay
Treaties of Peru
Treaties of the Philippines
Treaties of Poland
Treaties of Portugal
Treaties of Moldova
Treaties of Romania
Treaties of Russia
Treaties of Rwanda
Treaties of San Marino
Treaties of São Tomé and Príncipe
Treaties of Saudi Arabia
Treaties of Senegal
Treaties of Serbia and Montenegro
Treaties of Seychelles
Treaties of Slovakia
Treaties of Slovenia
Treaties of South Africa
Treaties of South Korea
Treaties of Spain
Treaties of Saint Kitts and Nevis
Treaties of Saint Vincent and the Grenadines
Treaties of Sierra Leone
Treaties of Suriname
Treaties of Eswatini
Treaties of Sweden
Treaties of Switzerland
Treaties of Syria
Treaties of Tajikistan
Treaties of North Macedonia
Treaties of East Timor
Treaties of Togo
Treaties of Trinidad and Tobago
Treaties of Tunisia
Treaties of Turkey
Treaties of Turkmenistan
Treaties of Ukraine
Treaties of the United Kingdom
Treaties of Tanzania
Treaties of the United States
Treaties of Uruguay
Treaties of Venezuela
Treaties of Zambia
International criminal law treaties
2000 in New York City
Treaties adopted by United Nations General Assembly resolutions
Treaties extended to Aruba
Treaties extended to the Caribbean Netherlands
2000 in labor relations